Fall River County is a county in the U.S. state of South Dakota. As of the 2020 United States Census, the population was 6,973. Its county seat is Hot Springs. The county was founded in 1883. It is named for Fall River which runs through it.

Geography
Fall River County lies at South Dakota's SW corner. Its south borderline abuts the north borderline of the state of Nebraska, and its west borderline abuts the east borderline of the state of Wyoming. The Fall River County terrain contains a mountainous area in the north-central portion, with rolling hills in the rest of the county. Outside the mountainous area, the county's highest point is its SW corner, at 3,970' (1210m) ASL. Of the several peaks in the mountainous area, one in the NE portion of that zone rises to 4,646' (1416m) ASL. The terrain slopes to the north and east. Discharging from the Angostura Reservoir, the Cheyenne River flows northeasterly through the upper part of the county, departing the county through its north boundary line into Custer County.

Major highways

Adjacent counties

 Custer County - north
 Oglala Lakota County - east
 Dawes County, Nebraska - southeast
 Sioux County, Nebraska - south
 Niobrara County, Wyoming - west

Protected areas

 Angostura Reservoir State Game Production Area
 Angostura State Recreation Area
 Bailey State Lakeside Use Area
 Battle Mountain State Game Production Area
 Black Hills National Forest (partial)
 Buffalo Gap National Grassland (partial)
 Friendshuh State Game Production Area (partial)
 Hill Ranch State Game Production Area
 Oral State Game Production Area
 Romey State Game Production Area
 Scherbarth State Game Production Area
 Sheps Canyon State Lakeside Use Area
 Sheps Canyon State Recreation Area
 Williams Dam State Game Production

Lakes
 Angostura Reservoir
 Coldbrook Lake
 Cottonwood Springs Lake

Demographics

2000 census
As of the 2000 census, there were 7,453 people, 3,127 households, and 1,976 families in the county. The population density was 4 people per square mile (2/km2). There were 3,812 housing units at an average density of 2 per square mile (1/km2). The racial makeup of the county was 90.51% White, 0.32% Black or African American, 6.05% Native American, 0.23% Asian, 0.05% Pacific Islander, 0.30% from other races, and 2.54% from two or more races.  1.74% of the population were Hispanic or Latino of any race. 33.6% were of German, 12.1% English, 9.5% Norwegian and 7.0% Irish ancestry.

There were 3,127 households, out of which 23.70% had children under the age of 18 living with them, 50.90% were married couples living together, 8.50% had a female householder with no husband present, and 36.80% were non-families. 32.70% of all households were made up of individuals, and 14.60% had someone living alone who was 65 years of age or older. The average household size was 2.23 and the average family size was 2.82.

The county population contained 22.80% under the age of 18, 5.80% from 18 to 24, 20.60% from 25 to 44, 28.30% from 45 to 64, and 22.50% who were 65 years of age or older. The median age was 46 years. For every 100 females there were 109.80 males. For every 100 females age 18 and over, there were 103.80 males.

The median income for a household in the county was $29,631, and the median income for a family was $37,827. Males had a median income of $30,646 versus $20,017 for females. The per capita income for the county was $17,048. About 7.80% of families and 13.60% of the population were below the poverty line, including 18.90% of those under age 18 and 9.80% of those age 65 or over.

2010 census
As of the 2010 census, there were 7,094 people, 3,272 households, and 1,899 families in the county. The racial makeup of the county was 88.6% white, 7.1% American Indian, 0.7% black or African American, 0.4% Asian, 0.3% from other races, and 2.9% from two or more races. Those of Hispanic or Latino origin made up 2.2% of the population. In terms of ancestry, 39.7% were German, 12.6% were Irish, 11.2% were English, 8.4% were Norwegian, 5.9% were Dutch, and 2.3% were American.

Of the 3,272 households, 20.4% had children under the age of 18 living with them, 46.2% were married couples living together, 8.9% had a female householder with no husband present, 42.0% were non-families, and 37.6% of all households were made up of individuals. The average household size was 2.10 and the average family size was 2.74. The median age was 50.5 years.

The median income for a household in the county was $35,833 and the median income for a family was $53,750. Males had a median income of $36,495 versus $32,058 for females. The per capita income for the county was $21,574. About 11.4% of families and 17.4% of the population were below the poverty line, including 11.3% of those under age 18 and 21.3% of those age 65 or over.

Communities

Cities
 Edgemont
 Hot Springs

Town
 Oelrichs

Census-designated places

 Angostura
 Ardmore
 Dudley
 Maverick Junction
 Oral
 Provo
 Smithwick

Other communities

 Burdock (ghost town)
 Cascade Springs (ghost town)
 Heppner (ghost town)
 Rumford

Townships
 Argentine
 Provo
 Robins

Unorganized territories
 Northeast Fall River
 Southwest Fall River

Politics
Fall River voters have been reliably Republican for decades. In no national election since 1936 has the county selected the Democratic Party candidate.

See also

 National Register of Historic Places listings in Fall River County, South Dakota

References

External links
 Fall River County Courthouse Official Website
 Hot Springs Chamber of Commerce
 Hot Springs City Hall
 Edgemont City Hall

 
1883 establishments in Dakota Territory
Populated places established in 1883